Cascade is an unincorporated community in Pittsylvania County, in the U.S. state of Virginia.

Windsor was listed on the National Register of Historic Places in 1974.

References

Unincorporated communities in Virginia
Unincorporated communities in Pittsylvania County, Virginia